Wai or WAI may refer to :

Places
 Wai, Maharashtra, a small town in India
 Wai (Vidhan Sabha constituency), a Maharashtra Legislative Assembly constituency centered around the town
 Wao State (Vav, Wai, Way), a former princely state in Banas Katha, Gujarat, India
 Wa (Japan) (倭), the Cantonese pronunciation of an ancient name of Japan, sometimes transcribed as Wai
 Koh Wai, also known as Poulo Wai or the Wai Islands, is a group of two small uninhabited islands in the Gulf of Siam, Cambodia

Other
 Wai, a term referring to the walled villages of Hong Kong
 Wai, Māori word for "water" or "river", used as a common prefix in New Zealand place names
 Wai, a form of Thai greeting
 Web Accessibility Initiative, an effort to improve the accessibility of the World Wide Web (WWW or Web) for people with disabilities
 NO WAI, a phrase that is part of the O RLY? Internet meme

See also
 Wai-Wai (disambiguation)

ja:ワイ